Malaki (also Romanized as Malakī and Malekī) is a village in Salakh Rural District, Shahab District, Qeshm County, Hormozgan Province, Iran. At the 2006 census, its population was 193, in 45 families.

References 

Populated places in Qeshm County